Walter Johnson (June 27, 1915 – June 14, 1985) was a noted historian of the United States and a political scientist, who believed that given political developments in post-Second World War America, there should be no strict separation between academics and politics.  He was a political progressive who believed his generation had a special responsibility to democracy.

Education
Johnson began his education at Dartmouth College where he took a B.A. in 1937.  He then undertook graduate work at the University of Chicago where he earned an M.A. in 1938 and his Ph.D. in history in 1941.

Academic career
Johnson's first academic post was that of instructor of history at the University of Chicago between 1940 and 1943.  He then assumed the post of assistant professor at the same university (1943–49) then associate professor (1949–50) and professor of history (1950–66). From 1963 to 1966, Johnson held an endowned chair: the Preston and Sterling Morton Professor of History.  From 1950 to 1961, he also served as the chair of the university's history department.  As chair of the history department, Johnson assisted in bringing important figures to the university.  These included Hannah Gray who served as president of the university, and prominent historian John Hope Franklin.  One of Johnson's graduate students, who went on to become a prominent historian of the United States, was Athan Theoharis.

Johnson was the Harold Vyvyan Harmsworth Professor of American History at Oxford University during the 1957–58 academic year.  In 1966-1982 he was a professor of history at the University of Hawaii, Honolulu.  In 1982-1985 he was a visiting professor of history at Grand Valley State College in Allendale, Michigan.

Political career
Johnson's involvement in politics began in 1940 when, on his own, he made stump speeches for President Franklin Roosevelt.  In 1943, because he was unable to serve in the military as a result of a failed physical exam, Johnson ran unsuccessfully for an alderman seat in Chicago, while suspecting the Chicago political machine and its money had resulted in his defeat.  Johnson then worked on an Illinois senatorial campaign and in the effort to draft Adlai Stevenson as a presidential candidate in 1952.

Published works
 The Battle Against Isolation, University of Chicago Press, 1944. 
 William Allen White's America, Holt, 1947.
 (Editor) Selected Letters of William Allen White, Holt, 1947. (reprint Greenwood Press, 1968)
 (Editor) Roosevelt and the Russians, Doubleday, 1949.
 How We Drafted Adlai Stevenson, Knopf, 1955.
 1600 Pennsylvania Avenue: Presidents and the People, 1929-59, Little, Brown, 1960.
 (With Francis J. Colligan) The Fulbright Program: A History, University of Chicago Press, 1965.
 The United States Since 1865, Ginn (Boston), 1965.
 (Editor) The Papers of Adlai Stevenson, eight volumes, Little, Brown, 1972–79.

References

External links
 Johnson Papers

1915 births
1985 deaths
Historians of the United States
Harold Vyvyan Harmsworth Professors of American History
Dartmouth College alumni
University of Chicago alumni
University of Chicago faculty
University of Hawaiʻi faculty
20th-century American historians
20th-century American male writers
American male non-fiction writers